is Rythem's eighth single. It was released on January 1, 2006, under Sony Music Entertainment Japan label. This single was only able to reach the #63 spot in the Oricon weekly charts.

The item's stock number is AICL-1664.

Track listing
20 Tsubu no Kokoro
Composition/Lyrics: Yui Nītsu
Arrangement: CHOKKAKU
Dear Friend
Composition/Lyrics: Yukari Katō
Arrangement: CHOKKAKU
song for you
Composition/Lyrics: Yui Nītsu
Arrangement: absolute3
20 Tsubu no Kokoro (instrumental)
Dear Friend (instrumental)

References 

2006 singles
Rythem songs